City Garden is a private housing estate in Fortress Hill, Hong Kong. It was built from 1983 to 1986 by Cheung Kong Holdings Limited. It consists of 14 blocks, each 28 storeys tall. Part of the site was occupied by the North Point Power Station before 1983.

Structure
City Garden is located at 233 Electric Road, Fortress Hill, Hong Kong. It is located beside Victoria Harbour. It consists of 14 residential buildings with 28 levels each. Phase 1 includes Block 1–6 while phase 2 includes Block 7–14. There are 2,393 residential units which accommodate more than 9,000 residents. City Garden Road is a two-lane road which serves as the main thoroughfare through City Garden.

Facilities
City Garden facilities include:
 3-level basement carpark
 Park
 Residential club, which has an indoor swimming pool, a fitness room, squash courts, sauna room, and a guest club
 Shopping mall
 Wellcome supermarket
 City Garden Hotel, Hong Kong

Security
Cayley Property Management Limited provides 24/7 security service for City Garden. Security guards are allocated at each residential building's lobby, the park and the basement carpark. A password, set by management, is needed to enter the residential buildings. As of 1 March 2007, a registered Octopus card can also function as entrance permit into the residential building.

Transportation
MTR Exit B of Fortress Hill station, which is on the Island line is the MTR station for City Garden.

Tram
Fortress Hill Road stop serves City Garden.

Bus
There are many bus routes, both local and cross-harbour, that service City Garden. They include,
 Routes: 2, 2A, 8H, 8S, 8X, 10, 18, 18P, 18X, 19, 19P, 23, 25, 25A, 27, 38, 41A, 42, 42C, 63, 65, 77, 81, 81P, 85A, 99, 102, 106, 110, 112, 116, 307P, 601, 603A, 619, 619X, 671, 678, 680, 680A, 680B, 680P, 690, 962E
 Overnight routes: N8, N8X, N72, N118, N122, N619, N680, N691, NA11
 Airport Bus: A11, Electric Road Market bus stop (18th) city-bound; Fortress Hill Station bus stop airport-bound
 Disneyland Resort route: R11, Electric Road Market bus stop (17th) city-bound; bus runs frequently after 8 pm; R8, Lantau Link Toll Plaza stop, interchange to A11, Electric Road Market bus stop (18th) for whole-day service

Mini-bus
Mini-bus are another way of transportation. The routes that serve City Garden include 19S, 49M, 56, 69

Taxis The red taxi serve City Garden. There is a taxi stand beside City Garden Hotel.

See also
 South Horizons, built on the site of the Ap Lei Chau Power Station

References

External links

 City Garden Hotel Official Website

North Point
Private housing estates in Hong Kong